Meteer Store House is a historic building located at Newark in New Castle County, Delaware.  It was built in 1808 and is a one-story, rectangular structure built of uncoursed stone rubble. It was built as part of a paper manufacturing complex referred to as "Meteer's Mill."

It was added to the National Register of Historic Places in 1983.  It is currently on private property.

References

Industrial buildings and structures on the National Register of Historic Places in Delaware
Industrial buildings completed in 1808
Buildings and structures in Newark, Delaware
Pulp and paper mills in the United States
National Register of Historic Places in New Castle County, Delaware
1808 establishments in Delaware